João da Silva is a Portuguese footballer who played as a half-back.

Career
Silva arrived at Benfica in 1943, making his debut at the hands of Janos Biri on 28 November, against Vitória de Setúbal. With Alcobia, Albino and Francisco Ferreira as competition, he was seen as back-up, playing only 15 games between league and cup in 1943–44. Nonetheless, he played all seven games in the campaign winning run in the Portuguese Cup, which included an 8–0 trashing of Estoril in the final.

With the breakthrough of Moreira in 1944–45, Silva dropped further in the pecking order, playing only 11 games, five of those in the league, enough to secure another honour, his first Primeira Divisão title. He left the club in 1945 with 26 games played and 2 goals scored.

Honours
Benfica
Primeira Divisão: 1944–45
Taça de Portugal: 1943–44

References
General
 

Specific

Year of birth missing
Possibly living people
Portuguese footballers
Association football midfielders
Primeira Liga players
S.L. Benfica footballers